HMS Cottesmore was a  of the British Royal Navy. The ship was built by the Scottish shipbuilder Yarrow at their Scotstoun, Glasgow shipyard in 1939–1940, being launched on 5 September 1940 and commissioning on 29 December that year.

Cottesmore served in the North Sea and English Channel  during the Second World War, and took part in the Invasion of Normandy in June 1944. She survived the war and was sold to Egypt in 1950, being renamed Ibrahim el Awal. The ship was again renamed Mohammed Ali el Kebir in 1951 and later renamed to Port Said. She was reduced to an accommodation hulk in 1986.

Construction and design
HMS Cottesmore was ordered from the Scottish shipbuilder Yarrow on 11 April 1939, as part of the second batch of ten Hunt-class destroyers, following on from the first batch of ten Hunts ordered in March that year. An error during design, which was only discovered once the first ship of the class  was built, meant that the ships as designed were dangerously unstable. To restore stability, the first 23 Hunts, including Cottesmore, were modified by removing a twin 4-inch mount, cutting down the ships' superstructure and adding ballast. These ships were known as Type I Hunts. Later ships in the class had their beam increased, which allowed them to carry the originally intended armament, and were known as Type II Hunts.

Displacement was  standard and   under full load.

The ship's main gun armament was four 4 inch (102 mm) QF Mk XVI dual purpose (anti-ship and anti-aircraft) guns in two twin mounts, with one mount forward and one aft. Additional close-in anti-aircraft armament was provided by a quadruple 2-pounder "pom-pom" mount. The ship was later modified by adding two single Oerlikon 20 mm cannon on the bridge wings, while a single "pom-pom" was mounted in the ship's bow. Up to 40 depth charges could be carried. The ship had a complement of 146 officers and men.

Cottesmore was laid down at Yarrow's Scotstoun shipyard on 12 December 1939 and was launched on 5 September 1940. She was commissioned on 29 December 1940, with the Pennant number L78.

Service
On commissioning, Cottesmore joined the 21st Destroyer Flotilla, based at Sheerness and employed on escorting convoys along the East coast of Britain, together with patrol duties and support for minelaying operations. The convoy's escort repelled the attack.

Cottesmore was one of several Sheerness-based destroyers ordered to intercept the German ships, but failed to make contact. On 28 July Cottesmore and sister ship  engaged German patrol boats off Cap de la Hague. At least one patrol boat, V 202 Hermann Bösch was sunk. On their return journey, the two destroyers were attacked by German aircraft, with Cottesmore being slightly damaged, with three of her crew wounded. On the night of 13/14 October 1942, Cottesmore formed part of a large force of Hunt-class destroyers (also including , Eskdale, Glaisdale and ) and eight Motor Torpedo Boats sent to stop the German auxiliary cruiser Komet, which was attempting to break out into the Atlantic in order to raid Allied shipping. Despite an escort of four Type 35 and Type 37 torpedo boats, Komet was sunk with all hands off Cherbourg by the British Motor Torpedo Boat MTB 236.

On 6 June 1944, Cottesmore took part in the Allied invasion of Normandy, escorting minesweepers to Gold Beach and then providing gunfire support to the landings. Following the initial landings, she remained on duty in the Channel until August, patrolling off the beaches to prevent attacks by German torpedo boats and midget submarines, and escorting reinforcement convoys. In November 1944, Cottesmore and sister ship  escorted the monitors  and  when they bombarded Walcheren during Operation Infatuate, the British landings on the island.

Cottesmore was reduced to reserve at Devonport on 28 February 1946, and in January 1949 was reduced further to Category C (or Extended) reserve. On 20 April 1950, the ship was sold to Egypt, and was renamed Ibrahim El Awal on 17 July 1950, and entered refit at the J. Samuel White shipyard at Cowes. She exchanged names with the Hunt-class destroyer Mohammed Ali el Kebir (the former ) in early 1951.

In the 1960s, her 2-pounder anti-aircraft guns were removed, and by 1971 had been renamed Port Said. Port Saids remaining close-in anti-aircraft armament was replaced by two Russian 37 mm and two 25 mm guns in the early 1970s, and in 1986 the ship, which was the last remaining Hunt-class destroyer in service, became an immobile accommodation hulk.

Notes

Citations

Sources
 
 
 
 
 
 

 
 
 
 

 

Hunt-class destroyers of the Royal Navy
Naval ships of Operation Neptune
Ships built on the River Clyde
1940 ships
World War II destroyers of the United Kingdom